Dafydd Elis-Thomas, Baron Elis-Thomas  (born 18 October 1946) is a Welsh politician who served as the Leader of Plaid Cymru from 1984 to 1991 and represented the Dwyfor Meirionnydd constituency in the Senedd from 1999 to 2021.

Born in Carmarthen, Wales, he was raised in Ceredigion and the Conwy Valley.  He represented Merioneth, then Meirionnydd Nant Conwy constituencies as a Member of Parliament from 1974 to 1992 and was the Llywydd of the Senedd (the speaker) from its inception in 1999 to 2011.  He is a member of the House of Lords, a former leader of Plaid Cymru, and, since 2004, a privy counsellor.  On 14 October 2016 he left the party in order to support the Welsh Government and sat as an independent in the Senedd.  In November 2017, he joined the Welsh Government. He was the Minister for Culture, Sport and Tourism until May 2021.

Personal
Thomas was born on 18 October 1946 at Priory Hospital, Carmarthen, and brought up in the Llandysul area of Ceredigion, and in Llanrwst in the Conwy Valley. In 1970, he married Elen Williams and had three sons. They later divorced. From the mid-1980s until 1992 his partner was Marjorie Thompson, the chairwoman of the Campaign for Nuclear Disarmament (CND). In 1993, he married Mair Parry-Jones. He lives in Llandaff, Cardiff (when working at the Senedd) and Betws-y-Coed (in the Aberconwy constituency, but prior to boundary changes in his constituency).

Professional career
He was the chairman of the Welsh Language Board between 1994 and 1999, and is a former member of the Arts Council of Wales and the British Film Institute where he was Chairman of Screen between 1992 and 1999. He was also a director and vice-chairman of Cynefin Environmental Ltd. between 1992 and 1999. A former university lecturer, he has also been the president of Bangor University since 2000, as well as currently being a member of the governing body of the Church in Wales.

Political career

UK Parliament
Having come third at Conwy in 1970, Thomas served as Member of Parliament for the Merioneth constituency between 1974 and 1983, initially as the "Baby of the House", and the Meirionnydd Nant Conwy constituency from 1983 to 1992. On entering the House of Commons in 1974, he became one of the first MPs to be allowed to take the oath of allegiance in the Welsh language as well as in English.

He was made a life peer in 1992, and changed his surname from Thomas to Elis-Thomas by deed poll, enabling him to take the title Baron Elis-Thomas, of Nant Conwy in the County of Gwynedd. He sat as a crossbench peer because at that time he had taken on the non-political role of chair of the Welsh Language Board; in 2012 he took the Plaid Cymru whip in the Lords.

Senedd
Elis-Thomas was elected to the newly established National Assembly for Wales (now called "Senedd Cymru" or "the Welsh Parliament", or simply Senedd) in 1999, representing the Meirionnydd Nant Conwy constituency until the 2007 election, and then the Dwyfor Meirionnydd constituency. He also held the position of Presiding Officer from the Assembly's inception in 1999 until 2011.  During his tenure as Presiding Officer, he expelled Assembly member Leanne Wood from the Assembly chamber during a December 2004 debate after Wood referred to Queen Elizabeth II as "Mrs Windsor" during a debate and refused to withdraw the remark, the first time an AM was ordered out of the chamber on those grounds.

From 2011, Elis-Thomas was Plaid Cymru's spokesperson for Environment, Energy and Planning before transferring to Rural Affairs, Fisheries and Food in 2012. In October 2016 he left Plaid Cymru, but remained in the Assembly as an Independent member. In November 2017, as part of a Welsh Government reshuffle, Elis-Thomas was appointed as Minister for Culture, Tourism and Sport.

Elis-Thomas is also Honorary President of the anti-fascist organisation Searchlight Cymru.

He announced on Dewi Llwyd's BBC Radio Cymru programme on 12 April 2020 that he will not be standing in the next Senedd Election in 2021. After long consideration he said that he will not be standing in Dwyfor Meirionnydd in 2021, but said that there are many other ways to serve society.

References

External links 
National Assembly for Wales Member profile

1946 births
Crossbench life peers
Living people
Plaid Cymru members of the Senedd
People from Carmarthen
Leaders of Plaid Cymru
Plaid Cymru MPs
UK MPs 1983–1987
UK MPs 1974
UK MPs 1974–1979
UK MPs 1979–1983
UK MPs 1987–1992
Wales AMs 1999–2003
Wales AMs 2003–2007
Wales AMs 2007–2011
Wales AMs 2011–2016
Wales MSs 2016–2021
Members of the Privy Council of the United Kingdom
Life peers created by Elizabeth II
Presidents of Bangor University
Welsh-speaking politicians
Presiding Officers of the Senedd
Independent members of the Senedd